Only Fools and Horses The Musical is a 2019 British stage musical with book, music and lyrics by Paul Whitehouse and Jim Sullivan, with additional music by Chas Hodges and writer John Sullivan. It is based on John Sullivan's BBC television sitcom of the same name which ran from 1981 to 2003.

Plot
The story compresses more than 20 years and 60 episodes of the show into a two-hour tale in which Rodney and Cassandra are making wedding preparations, Boycie and Marlene are trying to conceive, and Del Boy goes to a dating agency looking for a "sort" and ends up with Raquel.

It includes classic routines from the TV show such as Del Boy falling through the bar and Rodney trying to explain to Trigger that his name is not Dave.

Production history

West End (2019–2023)
A musical adaptation of the popular sitcom Only Fools and Horses was announced to be coming to the West End on 8 October 2018, the musical would be produced by Phil McIntyre Entertainments and written by Paul Whitehouse and Jim Sullivan. The initial casting announced Paul Whitehouse playing the role of Grandad, Tom Bennett as Del Boy and Ryan Hutton as Rodney. The musical was announced to have its first preview on 8 February 2019.

The musical made its world premiere at the Theatre Royal Haymarket on the 9 February 2019, before opening officially on 19 February 2019. The production was directed and choreographed by Caroline Jay Ranger, with musical supervision, orchestrations and arrangements by Stuart Morely. Set and costume was designed by Liz Ascroft, with lighting design by Richard G Jones and Sound Design by Rory Madden.

Due to the COVID-19 pandemic in the United Kingdom mandating the closure of all theatres, the production was forced to take a lengthy hiatus. It reopened on October 1, 2021, and was extended to October, 2022. 

It was announced that the production will close on 29 April 2023 following over 1000 performances marking it the longest-running production in the Theatre Royal Haymarket's history.

Musical numbers

Original West End Production

Act I 
 "Prologue – O Furtuna" – Orchestra (From Carmina Burana by Carl Orff)
 Replaced by Only Fools and Horses Overture in 2022

 "His Name is Derek Trotter" – Cripps & Ensemble (Music & Lyrics by Paul Whitehouse and Chas Hodges)
 "Only Fools and Horses/Hooky Street" – Del Boy, Rodney & Ensemble (Music & Lyrics by John Sullivan, Additional Lyrics by Jim Sullivan)
 "Not Now Grandad" – Del Boy, Rodney & Grandad (Music & Lyrics by Paul Whitehouse)
 "That's What I Like" – Ensemble (Music & Lyrics by Chas Hodges and Dave Peacock)
 "Where Have All The Cockneys Gone?" – Grandad & Ensemble (Music & Lyrics by Paul Whitehouse and Chas Hodges)
 "The Girl" – Raquel (Music & Lyrics by Jim Sullivan, Additional Lyrics by Paul Whitehouse)
 "Mange Tout" – Del Boy & Dating Agent (Music & Lyrics by Paul Whitehouse)
 "Bit of a Sort" – Del Boy & Dating Agent (Music & Lyrics by Jim Sullivan)
 "Raining for Grandad" – Grandad (Music by Jim Sullivan, Lyrics by Paul Whitehouse)
 "Being a Villain" – Danny Driscoll & Tony Driscoll (Lyrics by Paul Whitehouse, Music by Paul Whitehouse and Stuart Morely)
 "Lovely Day" – Del Boy, Raquel, Grandad & Ensemble (Music & Lyrics by Bill Withers & Skip Scarborough)

Act II 
 "Marriage & Love" – Rodney & Cassandra (Music & Lyrics by Paul Whitehouse)
 "West End Wendy" – Del Boy, Raquel & Ensemble (Lyrics by Paul Whitehouse, Music by Paul Whitehuse and Stuart Morely)
 "What have I let myself in for?" – Cassandra (Music & Lyrics by Paul Whitehouse)
 "Gaze Into My Ball" – Trigger & Ensemble (Lyrics by Paul Whitehouse, Music by Paul Whitehouse and Stuart Morely)
 "The Tadpole Song" – Boycie & Marlene (Music & Lyrics by Jim Sullivan)
 "Holding Back The Years" – Mrs Obookoo (Music & Lyrics by Mick Hucknall & Neil Moss)
 "Margate" – Ensemble (Music & Lyrics by Chas Hodges and Dave Peacock)
 "This Time Next Year" – Ensemble (Music & Lyrics by Chas Hodges and John Sullivan)

Original cast and characters 

From 2022 All the following played by the same actor - Marlene/Cassandra, Mickey Pearce/Danny Driscoll, Mike The Barman/Tony Driscoll and Dating Agent/Sid

Notable West End replacements
Grandad: Andy Mace, Les Dennis
Raquel: Ashleigh Gray

Creative team (original West End production)
 Book – Paul Whitehouse & Jim Sullivan
 Director & Choreographer – Caroline Jay Ranger
 Musical Supervisor, Orchestrator * Arranger – Stuart Morley
 Set & Custome Designer – Liz Ascroft
 Lighting Designer – Richard G Jones
 Sound Designer – Rory Madden
 Casting Director – David Grindrod CDG
 Associate Director & Choreographer – Denise Ranger

Critical reception 
Peter Mason in the Morning Star newspaper described the production as "well conceived, well wrought and, above all, great fun", adding that "in general, the tenor of the stage interpretation is rather more emotional than the TV series, with more pathos and some darker moments."

References

External links
 

2019 musicals
Only Fools and Horses
Musicals based on television series
British musicals
West End musicals
Musicals set in London